Gordon Herriot Cunningham, CBE, FRS (27 August 1892 – 18 July 1962) was the first New Zealand-based mycologist and plant pathologist. In 1936 he was appointed the first director of the DSIR Plant Diseases Division. Cunningham established the New Zealand Fungal Herbarium, and he published extensively on taxonomy of many fungal groups.  He is regarded as the 'Father' of New Zealand mycology.

Biography
In his life, he was a boxer, motorcyclist, gold prospector, farmer, horticulturist, forestry worker, and Gallipoli veteran. Following this colourful early life, ‘G.H. Cunn.’ joined the Biological Laboratory staff at the Department of Agriculture in 1919 as a mycologist, and began a systematic survey of plant diseases in New Zealand. He also began his work classifying fungi. In 1925, he published the first New Zealand work on plant diseases, Fungus Diseases of Fruit Trees in New Zealand. When the Biological Laboratory was moved from Wellington to Palmerston North in 1928 to become the Plant Research Station, Cunningham became the head of a mycology laboratory. The Plant Research Station disbanded in 1936, and Cunningham become the director of the DSIR Plant Diseases Division.

Cunningham produced definitive monographs of New Zealand Gasteromycetes (puffballs), Polyporaceae (pore fungi), Thelephoraceae (crust fungi), and Uredinales (rust fungi).

He made major contributions to plant pathology in New Zealand, especially with therapeutics and naming of pathogens. In the 1949 King's Birthday Honours, Cunningham was appointed a Commander of the Order of the British Empire for services in the field of plant research and plant diseases.

In 2004, Landcare Research named the rooms hosting the New Zealand Fungal Herbarium at its Auckland site the GH Cunningham Mycology Suite in his honour.

References

1892 births
1962 deaths
New Zealand Fellows of the Royal Society
New Zealand biologists
New Zealand farmers
New Zealand phytopathologists
New Zealand horticulturists
New Zealand mycologists
New Zealand Commanders of the Order of the British Empire
20th-century New Zealand scientists
20th-century biologists
20th-century agronomists